Haykashen, is a village in the Armavir Province of Armenia.

Notable people 
 Simon Martirosyan (1997-), two time Olympic silver medalist and two time world champion in weightlifting.
 Sedrak Saroyan (1967–2022), general and MP

See also 
Armavir Province

References 

Populated places in Armavir Province
Cities and towns built in the Soviet Union